Tomoca Coffee (also written TO.MO.CA) is a family-owned coffee company based in Addis Ababa, Ethiopia. It was established in February 1953. The company is known for its Italian-style coffee made with Ethiopian arabica beans.

The name derives from the Italian Torrefazione Moderna Café or "Modern coffee roasting".

Overview 
Tomoca is a member of the Ethiopia Commodity Exchange, and it exports its coffee to Sweden, Germany, the United States, Japan, and other countries. The company is led by Wondwossen Meshesha, the operations manager.

Tomoca has 22 branches in Addis Ababa and opened its first international branch in Tokyo in 2015. In September 2020, Tomoca opened its first coffee shop in Africa at the Two Rivers Mall in Nairobi, Kenya.

References

External links

Companies based in Addis Ababa
Food and drink companies of Ethiopia
Food and drink companies established in 1953
Coffee brands
Coffee in Ethiopia
Agriculture companies of Ethiopia